PPRA may refer to:

Protection of Pupil Rights Amendment in the United States
The Public Procurement Regulatory Authority in Pakistan